MFK Nováky was a Slovak association football club located in Nováky. It recently plays in Slovak 4. liga.

Club name history
 1937 – Vojenská XI Nováky
 1938 – ŠK Nováky
 1949 – Sokol Chemozávod Nováky
 1959 – Iskra Nováky
 1967 – TJ CHZWP Nováky
 1989 – TJ NCHZ Nováky
 1992 – FK NCHZ - DAK Nováky
 1995 – FK NCHZ Nováky
 2004 – FK Nováky
 2006 – MFK Nováky

References

External links
Nováky official page 

Defunct football clubs in Slovakia
Association football clubs established in 1937
Association football clubs disestablished in 2015
1937 establishments in Slovakia